Pheidole pallidula is a species of ant in the genus Pheidole. It is widespread around the Mediterranean.

References

External links

pallidula
Hymenoptera of Europe
Insects described in 1849